Tammy Suzanne Green Baldwin (born February 11, 1962) is an American lawyer and politician who has served as the junior United States senator from Wisconsin since 2013. A member of the Democratic Party, she served three terms in the Wisconsin State Assembly, representing the 78th district, and from 1999 to 2013 represented Wisconsin's 2nd congressional district in the United States House of Representatives. In 2012, Baldwin was elected to the United States Senate, defeating Republican nominee Tommy Thompson. In 2018, Baldwin was reelected, defeating Republican nominee Leah Vukmir.

Baldwin, who is a lesbian, became the first openly LGBT woman elected to the House of Representatives and to the Senate in 1999 and 2013, respectively. She also was the first woman to be elected to either chamber from Wisconsin. Baldwin identifies as a progressive, and she has a consistently progressive voting record. She supports Medicare for All, LGBTQ rights, and gun control, and opposed the Iraq War.

Early life, education, and early political career
Baldwin was born and grew up in Madison, Wisconsin. Her mother, who died in 2017, was 19 and going through a divorce when Baldwin was born. Baldwin was raised by her grandparents and spent Saturdays with her mother, who suffered from mental illness and opioid addiction. Her maternal grandfather, biochemist David E. Green, was Jewish (the son of immigrants from Russia and Germany), and her maternal grandmother, who was Anglican, was English-born. Baldwin's aunt is biochemist Rowena Green Matthews. Through her maternal grandfather, Baldwin is a third cousin of comedian Andy Samberg.

Baldwin graduated from Madison West High School in 1980 as the class valedictorian. She earned a B.A. from Smith College in 1984 and a J.D. from the University of Wisconsin Law School in 1989. She was a lawyer in private practice from 1989 to 1992.

Baldwin was first elected to political office in 1986 at the age of 24, when she was elected to the Dane County Board of Supervisors, a position she held until 1994. She also served one year on the Madison City Council to fill a vacancy in the coterminous district.

Wisconsin Assembly (1993–1999)

Elections
In 1992, Baldwin ran to represent Wisconsin's 78th Assembly district in western Madison. She won the Democratic primary with 43% of the vote. In the general election, Baldwin defeated Mary Kay Baum (Labor and Farm Party nominee) and Patricia Hevenor (Republican Party nominee) by a vote of 59%-23%-17%. She was one of just six openly gay political candidates nationwide to win a general election in 1992.

In 1994, Baldwin won election to a second term with 76% of the vote. In 1996, she was elected to a third term with 71% of the vote.

Tenure
Baldwin was the first openly lesbian member of the Wisconsin Assembly and one of a very few openly gay politicians in the country at the time. In 1993, she said she was disappointed by Democratic President Bill Clinton's support of the military's "don't ask, don't tell" policy. In early 1994, she proposed legalizing same-sex marriage in Wisconsin. In 1995, she proposed domestic partnerships in Wisconsin.

Baldwin opposes capital punishment in Wisconsin.

Committee assignments
Criminal Justice Committee
Education Committee (Chair)

U.S. House of Representatives (1999–2013)

Elections
In 1998, U.S. Congressman Scott Klug of the 2nd district, based in Madison, announced he would retire, prompting Baldwin to run for the seat. She won the Democratic primary with a plurality of 37% of the vote. In the general election she defeated Republican nominee Josephine Musser 53%-47%.

Baldwin was the first woman elected to Congress from Wisconsin. She was also the first openly gay person elected to the House of Representatives, and the first open lesbian elected to Congress. In 2008, Baldwin and Representative Barney Frank co-founded the Congressional LGBTQ+ Equality Caucus.

In 2000, Baldwin won reelection to a second term, defeating Republican John Sharpless 51%-49%, a difference of 8,902 votes. She lost eight of the district's nine counties, but carried the largest, Dane County, with 55% of the vote.

After the 2000 census the 2nd district was made significantly more Democratic in redistricting. Baldwin won reelection to a third term in the newly redrawn 2nd district with 66% of the vote against Republican Ron Greer. In 2004, she beat Dave Magnum 63%-37%. She won a 2006 rematch against Magnum, again winning 63%-37%. In 2008, she defeated Peter Theron 69%-31%, and in 2010 she won a seventh term with 62% of the vote against Chad Lee.

Committee assignments
Committee on Energy and Commerce
Subcommittee on Environment and Economy
Subcommittee on Health

U.S. Senate (2013–present)

Elections

2012 

 
Baldwin ran as the Democratic nominee against Republican nominee Tommy Thompson, who had formerly been governor and Secretary of Health and Human Services. She announced her candidacy on September 6, 2011, in a video emailed to supporters. She ran uncontested in the primary election, and spoke at the 2012 Democratic National Convention about tax policy, campaign finance reform, and equality in the United States.

She was endorsed by Democracy for America, and she received campaign funding from EMILY's List, the Gay & Lesbian Victory Fund, and LPAC. Baldwin was endorsed by the editorial board of The Capital Times, who wrote that "Baldwin's fresh ideas on issues ranging from job creation to health care reform, along with her proven record of working across lines of partisanship and ideology, and her grace under pressure mark her as precisely the right choice to replace retiring U.S. Senator Herb Kohl".

Thompson claimed during his campaign that her "far-left approach leaves this country in jeopardy".

The candidates had three debates, on September 28, October 18, and October 26. According to Baldwin's Federal Election Commission filings, she raised about $12 million, over $5 million more than her opponent.

On November 6, 2012, Baldwin became the first openly gay candidate to be elected to the U.S. Senate, with 51.4% of the vote. Because of her 14 years in the House of Representatives, under Senate rules she had the highest seniority in her entering class of senators. She was succeeded in Congress by State Assemblyman Mark Pocan, who had earlier succeeded her in the state legislature.

Baldwin was featured in Time's November 19, 2012, edition, in the Verbatim section, where she was quoted as saying "I didn't run to make history" on her historic election. In a separate section, she was also mentioned as a new face to watch in the Senate.

2018 

Baldwin won a second term in 2018 with 55.4% of the vote, defeating Republican Leah Vukmir by a margin of approximately 11%.

Committee assignments
Committee on Appropriations
Subcommittee on Agriculture, Rural Development, Food and Drug Administration, and Related Agencies (Chair)
Subcommittee on Defense
Subcommittee on Energy and Water Development
Subcommittee on Homeland Security
Subcommittee on Labor, Health and Human Services, Education, and Related Agencies
Subcommittee on Military Construction, Veterans Affairs, and Related Agencies
Committee on Commerce, Science, and Transportation
Subcommittee on Communications, Media, and Broadband
Subcommittee on Consumer Protection, Product Safety, and Data Security
Subcommittee on Oceans, Fisheries, Climate Change and Manufacturing (Chair)
Subcommittee on Surface Transportation, Maritime, Freight, Freight, and Ports
Committee on Health, Education, Labor, and Pensions
Subcommittee on Employment and Workplace Safety
Subcommittee on Primary Health and Retirement Security

Political positions

Ideology
In 2003, Baldwin served on the advisory committee of the Progressive Majority, a political action committee dedicated to electing progressive candidates to public office.

In October 2012, Baldwin described herself as a progressive in the mold of Robert M. La Follette. She and Wisconsin's senior U.S Senator Ron Johnson deviate on votes more frequently than any other pair of senators from the same state.

Baldwin is a member of the Congressional Progressive Caucus and the Afterschool Caucuses. According to a 2011 National Journal survey, she was among the most liberal members of the House. As of 2012, her voting record made her one of the most liberal members of Congress.

Agriculture 
In May 2019, Baldwin and eight other Democratic senators sent United States Secretary of Agriculture Sonny Perdue a letter that criticized the USDA for purchasing pork from JBS USA and called it "counterproductive and contradictory" for companies to receive funding from "U.S. taxpayer dollars intended to help American farmers struggling with this administration's trade policy." The senators requested that the department "ensure these commodity purchases are carried out in a manner that most benefits the American farmer’s bottom line—not the business interests of foreign corporations."

Antitrust, competition, and corporate regulation 
In June 2019, Baldwin was one of six Democrats led by Amy Klobuchar who signed letters to the Federal Trade Commission (FTC) and the Department of Justice recounting that many of them had "called on both the FTC and the Justice Department to investigate potential anticompetitive activity in these markets, particularly following the significant enforcement actions taken by foreign competition enforcers against these same companies" and requesting that each agency confirm whether it had opened antitrust investigations into each of the companies and that each agency pledge it would publicly release any such investigation's findings.

Economy and jobs
In a September 2015 radio interview, Baldwin said that she, the Pope, and Donald Trump all supported repeal of the carried interest tax loophole. Politifact stated that "while Pope Francis has called for helping the poor and addressing economic inequality, we could not find that has spoken out on this particular tax break."

In 2016, the U.S. Chamber of Commerce, a business-oriented lobbying group that usually supports Republican candidates, gave Baldwin a 32% cumulative score on "key business votes."

In October 2017, CBS News reported that the Freedom Partners, a Koch-funded group, had "launched a $1.6 million television and digital ad campaign" targeting Baldwin for her "stance on taxes." The ads charged her with having "voted for five trillion dollars in more taxes" and with having "supported higher income taxes, sales taxes—even energy taxes." One ad stated: "If Tammy Baldwin opposes tax reform, it's proof that she opposes jobs."

In October 2017 the editors of The Capital Times praised Baldwin and Bernie Sanders for their vocal opposition to a budget resolution that they believed would increase income inequality. Baldwin was described as "one of the budget's most ardent foes."

In November 2017, Baldwin expressed opposition to the Trump tax-reform bill, the Tax Cuts and Jobs Act of 2017, saying that it was being drafted "behind closed doors" and charging that it was being "shoved through." In its place she promoted the Stronger Way Act, a bill that she and Cory Booker (D-NJ) co-sponsored.

In 2018, Baldwin sponsored the Reward Work Act of 2018, which proposed to guarantee the right of employees in listed companies to elect one-third of the board of directors.

In February 2019, Baldwin, Roy Blunt, and Ron Wyden led nine other senators in sponsoring the Craft Beverage Modernization and Tax Reform Act, legislation imposing a reduction in excise taxes, compliance burdens, and regulations for brewers, cider makers, vintners, and distillers as part of an attempt to ensure the continued growth of the craft beverage industry.

In July 2019, Baldwin signed a letter to United States Secretary of Labor Alexander Acosta that advocated that the U.S. Occupational Safety and Health Administration (OSHA) make a full investigation into a complaint filed on May 20 by a group of Chicago-area employees of McDonald's that detailed instances of workplace violence, such as customers throwing hot coffee and threatening employees with firearms. The senators argued that McDonald's could and should "do more to protect its employees, but employers will not take seriously their obligations to provide a safe workplace if OSHA does not enforce workers rights to a hazard-free workplace."

Terrorism
In November 2013, Baldwin introduced a bill that would "bring greater government transparency, oversight and due process whenever authorities use information gathered for intelligence purposes to make domestic non-terrorism cases against Americans."

Baldwin described the mass shooting in Orlando, Florida, in June 2016 as a "hate crime" and said "The question now for America is are we going to come together and stand united against hate, gun violence and terrorism?"

Immigration
Baldwin voted against building a fence on the U.S.-Mexico border in 2006. In June 2013, she voted for S. 744, the Border Security, Economic Opportunity, and Immigration Modernization Act, which would have enabled undocumented immigrants to acquire legal residency status and, later, citizenship. She voted against Kate's Law in 2016.

In 2017, NumbersUSA, an immigration reduction advocacy group the Southern Poverty Law Center calls one of multiple "core nativist organizations created by white nationalist John Tanton to advance his views", gave Baldwin an overall grade of F, with a score of 11% on immigration bills. On the reduction of unnecessary worker visas, she scored a C; on the reduction of refugee and asylum fraud, and on the reduction of amnesty enticements, she scored an F-.

Opposition to Iraq War
Baldwin was a vocal critic of the Iraq War. On October 10, 2002, she was among the 133 members of the House who voted against authorizing the invasion of Iraq. She warned there would be "postwar challenges," observing that "there is no history of democratic government in Iraq," that its "economy and infrastructure are in ruins after years of war and sanctions," and that rebuilding would take "a great deal of money." In 2005, she joined the Out of Iraq Caucus.

Impeachment of Dick Cheney and Alberto Gonzales
On August 1, 2007, Baldwin cosponsored H. Res. 333, a bill proposing articles of impeachment against Vice President Dick Cheney, and H Res. 589, a bill proposing the impeachment of Attorney General Alberto Gonzales. On January 20, 2008, Baldwin wrote in the Milwaukee Journal Sentinel that on December 14, 2007, "I joined with my colleagues on the House Judiciary Committee, Reps. Robert Wexler (D-Fla.) and Luis Gutierrez (D-Ill.), in urging Chairman Rep. John Conyers (D-Mich.) to conduct hearings on a resolution of impeachment now pending consideration in that committee." Although some constituents "say I have gone too far," others "argue I have not gone far enough" and feel "we are losing our democracy and that I should do more to hold the Bush administration accountable for its actions."

Health care
An outspoken advocate of single-payer, government-run universal health care system since her days as a state legislator, Baldwin introduced the Health Security for All Americans Act, which would have required states to provide such a system, in 2000, 2002, 2004, and 2005. The bill died each time it was introduced without a House vote.

She has said that she "believes strongly that a single-payer health system is the best way to comprehensively and fairly reform our health care system." In November 2009, Baldwin voted for the version of health-care reform that included a public option, a government-run health-care plan that would have competed with private insurers, but only the House passed that version. She ultimately voted for the Patient Protection and Affordable Care Act, also known as Obamacare, which became law in 2010. Baldwin said she hoped a public option in the ACA would lead to a single-payer system. The first version of the ACA Baldwin voted for included a public option, but the final version did not.

In 2009, Baldwin introduced the Ending LGBT Health Disparities Act (ELHDA), which sought to advance LGBT health priorities by promoting research, cultural competency, and non-discrimination policies. The bill was not passed.

In April 2017, Baldwin was one of five Democratic senators to sign a letter to President Trump warning that failure "to take immediate action to oppose the lawsuit or direct House Republicans to forgo this effort will increase instability in the insurance market, as insurers may choose not to participate in the marketplace in 2018" and that they remained concerned that his administration "has still not provided certainty to insurers and consumers that you will protect the cost-sharing subsidies provided under the law."

Baldwin wrote an op-ed in 2017 titled "Why I support Medicare for all and other efforts to expand health coverage."

In April 2018, Baldwin was one of ten senators to sponsor the Choose Medicare Act, an expanded public option for health insurance that also increased Obamacare subsidies and rendered people with higher incomes eligible for its assistance.

In January 2019, during the 2018–19 United States federal government shutdown, Baldwin was one of 34 senators to sign a letter to Commissioner of Food and Drugs Scott Gottlieb recognizing the efforts of the FDA to address the shutdown's effect on public health and employees while remaining alarmed "that the continued shutdown will result in increasingly harmful effects on the agency's employees and the safety and security of the nation's food and medical products."

In February 2019 Baldwin was one of 11 senators to sign a letter to insulin manufactures Eli Lilly and Company, Novo Nordisk, and Sanofi about their increased insulin prices depriving patients of "access to the life-saving medications they need."

In July 2019 Baldwin was one of eight senators to cosponsor the Palliative Care and Hospice Education and Training Act (PCHETA), a bill intended to strengthen training for new and existing physicians, people who teach palliative care, and other providers who are on the palliative care team that grants patients and their families a voice in their care and treatment goals.

In August 2019, Baldwin was one of 19 senators to sign a letter to United States Secretary of the Treasury Steve Mnuchin and United States Secretary of Health and Human Services Alex Azar requesting data from the Trump administration in order to help states and Congress understand the potential consequences of the Texas v. United States Affordable Care Act lawsuit, writing that an overhaul of the present health care system would form "an enormous hole in the pocketbooks of the people we serve as well as wreck state budgets". The same month, Baldwin, three other Senate Democrats, and Bernie Sanders signed a letter to Acting FDA Commissioner Ned Sharpless in response to Novartis falsifying data as part of an attempt to gain the FDA's approval for its new gene therapy Zolgensma, writing that it was "unconscionable that a drug company would provide manipulated data to federal regulators in order to rush its product to market, reap federal perks, and charge the highest amount in American history for its medication."

In October 2019, Baldwin was one of 27 senators to sign a letter to Senate Majority Leader Mitch McConnell and Senate Minority Leader Chuck Schumer advocating the passage of the Community Health Investment, Modernization, and Excellence (CHIME) Act, which was set to expire the following month. The senators warned that if the funding for the Community Health Center Fund (CHCF) was allowed to expire, it "would cause an estimated 2,400 site closures, 47,000 lost jobs, and threaten the health care of approximately 9 million Americans."

Housing 
In April 2019, Baldwin was one of 41 senators to sign a bipartisan letter to the housing subcommittee praising the United States Department of Housing and Urban Development's Section 4 Capacity Building program as authorizing "HUD to partner with national nonprofit community development organizations to provide education, training, and financial support to local community development corporations (CDCs) across the country" and expressing disappointment that President Trump's budget "has slated this program for elimination after decades of successful economic and community development." The senators wrote of their hope that the subcommittee would support continued funding for Section 4 in Fiscal Year 2020.

Resolution on 9/11 victims

Baldwin was one of 22 members of Congress to vote against a 2006 9/11 memorial bill; she said she "voted against the bill because Republicans had inserted provisions praising the Patriot Act and hard-line immigration measures". She voted nine times in favor of other similar bills.

Her vote received renewed attention in the 2012 U.S. Senate campaign when Tommy Thompson's campaign released an ad about it, which Politifact rated "Mostly False". Thompson said, "Wisconsin voters need to know that Congresswoman Tammy Baldwin put her extreme views above honoring the men and women who were murdered by the terrorists in the Sept. 11 attacks on our nation." Politifact stated, "Thompson said his Democratic challenger voted against a resolution honoring 9/11 victims. Technically, he's correct. Baldwin voted against the measure in 2006—and criticized Republicans for adding in references to the Patriot Act, immigration bills, and other controversial matters. But Baldwin has voted nine times in favor of similar resolutions, and the day before the vote in question supported creation of a memorial at the World Trade Center site. Thompson's statement contains an element of truth, but leaves out critical information that would give a different impression. That's our definition of Mostly False."

ACORN
In 2009, when the House voted overwhelmingly to defund ACORN, Baldwin was one of 75 House members (all Democrats) who voted against the measure.

2016 U.S. presidential election

On October 20, 2013, Baldwin was one of sixteen female Democratic Senators to sign a letter endorsing Hillary Clinton as the Democratic nominee in the 2016 presidential election.

Handling of Veterans Affairs report
In January 2015 USA Today obtained a copy of a report by the United States Department of Veterans Affairs inspector general about the Tomah, Wisconsin Veterans Affairs medical facility. The report said that two physicians at the Tomah VA were among the biggest prescribers of opioids in a multi-state region, raising "potentially serious concerns." Baldwin's office had received the report in August 2014 but did not take action until January 2015, when Baldwin called for an investigation after the Center for Investigative Reporting published details of the report, including information about a veteran who died from an overdose at the facility. A whistleblower and former Tomah VA employee learned that Baldwin's office had a copy of the report, and he repeatedly emailed Baldwin's office asking that she take action on the issue. Baldwin's office did not explain why they waited from August 2014 to January 2015 to call for an investigation. Baldwin was the only member of Congress who had a copy of the inspection report.

In February 2015, Baldwin fired her deputy state director over her handling of the VA report. The aide was offered but declined a severance deal that included a cash payout and a confidentiality agreement that would have required her to keep quiet. The aide filed an ethics complaint with the United States Senate Select Committee on Intelligence. The complaint was dismissed as lacking merit. Baldwin said, "we should have done a better job listening to and communicating with another constituent with whom we were working on problems at the VA", and that she had started a review of why her office had failed to act on the report. As a result of the review, Baldwin fined her chief of staff, demoted her state director, and reassigned a veterans' outreach staffer. In November 2017, Baldwin co-sponsored legislation designed to strengthen opioid safety in the Department of Veterans Affairs.

In December 2018, Baldwin was one of 21 senators to sign a letter to United States Secretary of Veterans Affairs Robert Wilkie calling it "appalling that the VA is not conducting oversight of its own outreach efforts". A report from the Government Accountability Office stated, "poor leadership at the VA resulted in a misuse of resources and lackluster outreach efforts to at-risk veterans." Baldwin and other senators "are demanding a full accounting of the VA’s budget for suicide prevention and mental health outreach and for the VA to consult with public and mental health outreach experts on how to better track the VA’s performance", and requesting that Wilkie "consult with experts with proven track records of successful public and mental health outreach campaigns with a particular emphasis on how those individuals measure success."

Drug policy 
In December 2016, Baldwin was one of 17 senators to sign a letter to President-elect Trump asking him to fulfill a campaign pledge to bring down the cost of prescription drugs, stating their willingness "to advance measures to achieve this goal" and calling on Trump "to partner with Republicans and Democrats alike to take meaningful steps to address the high cost of prescription drugs through bold administrative and legislative actions."

In February 2017, Baldwin and thirty other senators signed a letter to Kaléo Pharmaceuticals in response to the opioid-overdose-reversing device Evzio rising in price from $690 in 2014 to $4,500 and requested the company answer what the detailed price structure for Evzio was, the number of devices Kaléo Pharmaceuticals set aside for donation, and the totality of federal reimbursements Evzio received in the previous year.

In March 2017, Baldwin was one of 21 senators led by Ed Markey to sign a letter to Senate Majority Leader Mitch McConnell that said that 12% of adult Medicaid beneficiaries had some form or a substance abuse disorder, that one-third of treatment for opioid and other substance use disorders in the United States is financed by Medicaid, and that the American Health Care Act could "very literally translate into a death spiral for those with opioid use disorders" due to inadequate funding, often resulting in individuals abandoning substance use disorder treatment.

In December 2017, Baldwin was one of six senators to sign a letter to Senate Majority Leader Mitch McConnell and Minority Leader Chuck Schumer requesting their "help in ensuring the long-term sustainability of the 340B program", a Trump administration rule mandating that drug companies give discounts to health-care organizations presently serving large numbers of low-income patients.

Central America 
In April 2019, Baldwin was one of 34 senators to sign a letter to Trump encouraging him "to listen to members of your own Administration and reverse a decision that will damage our national security and aggravate conditions inside Central America", asserting that Trump had "consistently expressed a flawed understanding of U.S. foreign assistance" since becoming president and that he was "personally undermining efforts to promote U.S. national security and economic prosperity" by preventing the use of Fiscal Year 2018 national security funding. The senators argued that foreign assistance to Central American countries created less migration to the U.S. by helping to improve conditions in those countries.

Russia 
In February 2017, Baldwin was one of 11 senators to sign a letter to United States Attorney General Jeff Sessions expressing their concern "about credible allegations that the Trump campaign, transition team, and Administration has colluded with the Russian government, including most recently the events leading to the resignation of Lieutenant General Michael Flynn as National Security Adviser." The senators requested the creation of "an independent Special Counsel to investigate collusion with the Russian government by General Flynn and other Trump campaign, transition and Administrative officials" in order to maintain "the confidence, credibility and impartiality of the Department of Justice".

In December 2018, after United States Secretary of State Mike Pompeo announced the Trump administration was suspending its obligations in the Intermediate-Range Nuclear Forces Treaty in 60 days in the event that Russia continued to violate the treaty, Baldwin was one of 26 senators to sign a letter expressing concern over the administration "now abandoning generations of bipartisan U.S. leadership around the paired goals of reducing the global role and number of nuclear weapons and ensuring strategic stability with America's nuclear-armed adversaries" and calling on Trump to continue arms negotiations.

Saudi Arabia 
In June 2017, Baldwin voted for a resolution by Rand Paul and Chris Murphy that would block Trump's $510 million sale of precision-guided munitions to Saudi Arabia that made up a portion of the $110 billion arms sale Trump announced during his visit to Saudi Arabia the previous year.

In March 2018, Baldwin voted against tabling a resolution spearheaded by Bernie Sanders, Chris Murphy, and Mike Lee that would have required Trump to withdraw American troops either in or influencing Yemen within the next 30 days unless they were combating Al-Qaeda. In December 2021, she voted for a resolution, opposed by a 67-30 majority, that would have blocked a $650 billion weapons sale to Saudi Arabia.

Israel 
In May 2020, Baldwin voiced her opposition to Israel's plan to annex parts of the Israeli-occupied West Bank.

United States Postal Service 
In March 2019, Baldwin was a cosponsor of a bipartisan resolution led by Gary Peters and Jerry Moran that opposed privatization of the United States Postal Service (USPS), citing the USPS as a self-sustained establishment and noting concerns that privatization could cause higher prices and reduced services for its customers, especially in rural communities.

Trade 
In September 2016, Baldwin was one of 12 senators to sign a letter to President Obama asserting that the passage of the Trans-Pacific Partnership "in its current form will perpetuate a trade policy that advantages corporations at the expense of American workers" and that there would be an "erosion of U.S. manufacturing and middle class jobs, and accelerate the corporate race to the bottom" if provisions were not fixed.

Climate change 
In November 2018, Baldwin was one of 25 Democratic senators to cosponsor a resolution in response to findings of the Intergovernmental Panel On Climate Change report and National Climate Assessment. The resolution affirmed the senators' acceptance of the findings and their support for bold action to address climate change.

LGBT rights 
In September 2014, Baldwin was one of 69 members of the US House and Senate to sign a letter to then-FDA commissioner Sylvia Burwell requesting that the FDA revise its policy banning donation of corneas and other tissues by men who have had sex with another man in the preceding five years.

In October 2018, Baldwin was one of 20 senators to sign a letter to Secretary of State Mike Pompeo urging him to reverse the rolling back of a policy that granted visas to same-sex partners of LGBTQ diplomats who had unions that were not recognized by their home countries, writing that too many places around the world have seen LGBTQ individuals "subjected to discrimination and unspeakable violence, and receive little or no protection from the law or local authorities" and that refusing to let LGBTQ diplomats bring their partners to the US would be equivalent of upholding "the discriminatory policies of many countries around the world."

In June 2019, Baldwin was one of 18 senators to sign a letter to Pompeo, requesting an explanation of a State Department decision not to issue an official statement that year commemorating Pride Month, nor to issue the annual cable outlining activities for embassies commemorating Pride Month. They also asked why the LGBTI special envoy position remained vacant and asserted that "preventing the official flying of rainbow flags and limiting public messages celebrating Pride Month signals to the international community that the United States is abandoning the advancement of LGBTI rights as a foreign policy priority."

Gun control 
In January 2016, Baldwin was one of 18 senators to sign a letter to Thad Cochran and Barbara Mikulski requesting that the Labor, Health and Education subcommittee hold a hearing on whether to allow the Centers for Disease Control and Prevention (CDC) to fund a study of gun violence and "the annual appropriations rider that some have interpreted as preventing it" with taxpayer dollars. The senators noted their support for taking steps "to fund gun-violence research, because only the United States government is in a position to establish an integrated public-health research agenda to understand the causes of gun violence and identify the most effective strategies for prevention."

In November 2017, Baldwin was a cosponsor of the Military Domestic Violence Reporting Enhancement Act, a bill to create a charge of domestic violence under the Uniform Code of Military Justice (UCMJ) and stipulate that convictions must be reported to federal databases to keep abusers from purchasing firearms within three days in an attempt to close a loophole in the UCMJ whereby convicted abusers retain the ability to purchase firearms.

In 2018, Baldwin was a cosponsor of the NICS Denial Notification Act, legislation developed in the aftermath of the Stoneman Douglas High School shooting that would require federal authorities to inform states within a day after a person failing the National Instant Criminal Background Check System attempted to buy a firearm.

In January 2019, Baldwin was one of 40 senators to introduce the Background Check Expansion Act, a bill that would require background checks for either the sale or transfer of all firearms, including unlicensed sellers. Exceptions to the bill's background check requirement included transfers between members of law enforcement, loaning firearms for either hunting or sporting events on a temporary basis, giving firearms to members of one's immediate family, firearms being transferred as part of an inheritance, or giving a firearm to another person temporarily for immediate self-defense.

Veterans 
In August 2013, Baldwin was one of 23 Democratic senators to sign a letter to the Defense Department warning that some payday lenders were "offering predatory loan products to service members at exorbitant triple digit effective interest rates and loan products that do not include the additional protections envisioned by the law" and asserting that service members and their families "deserve the strongest possible protections and swift action to ensure that all forms of credit offered to members of our armed forces are safe and sound."

Electoral history

U.S. House of Representatives (1998–2010)

United States Senate

Personal life
Baldwin is the granddaughter of biochemist David E. Green and the niece of another biochemist, Rowena Green Matthews. Baldwin is also a third cousin of comedian and actor Andy Samberg. For 15 years, Baldwin's domestic partner was Lauren Azar; in 2009, the couple registered as domestic partners in Wisconsin. They separated in 2010. Baldwin was baptized Episcopalian but considers herself "unaffiliated" with a religion.

Awards and honors 
In June 2020, in honor of the 50th anniversary of the first LGBTQ Pride parade, Queerty named Baldwin as one of 50 heroes “leading the nation toward equality, acceptance, and dignity for all people”.

See also
 List of LGBT members of the United States Congress
 Women in the United States House of Representatives
 Women in the United States Senate

References

External links

Senator Tammy Baldwin official U.S. Senate website
Tammy Baldwin for Senate campaign website

"Federal Politics and Medical Practices", Presentation given by Baldwin at the University of Wisconsin School of Medicine and Public Health, January 25, 2007
"Health Care Reform in 2009? The View from Washington, DC", Presentation given by Baldwin at the University of Wisconsin School of Medicine and Public Health, February 4, 2008

|-

|-

|-

|-

|-

|-

1962 births
20th-century American lawyers
20th-century American politicians
20th-century American women politicians
21st-century American politicians
21st-century American women politicians
American people of English descent
American people of German-Jewish descent
American people of Russian-Jewish descent
County supervisors in Wisconsin
Democratic Party members of the United States House of Representatives from Wisconsin
Democratic Party United States senators from Wisconsin
Female members of the United States House of Representatives
Female United States senators
Lesbian politicians
American LGBT city council members
LGBT members of the United States Congress
LGBT state legislators in Wisconsin
LGBT people from Wisconsin
Living people
Politicians from Madison, Wisconsin
Smith College alumni
University of Wisconsin Law School alumni
Wisconsin city council members
Wisconsin lawyers
Women city councillors in Wisconsin
Women state legislators in Wisconsin
20th-century American women lawyers
Madison West High School alumni
LGBT lawyers
Democratic Party members of the Wisconsin State Assembly